The following is a list of works about Paris, France:

List of books, arranged by author

In English
 Edwards, Henry Sutherland. Old and new Paris: its history, its people, and its places (2 vol 1894) online
Fierro, Alfred. Historical Dictionary of Paris (1998)  392pp, an abridged translation of his Histoire et dictionnaire de Paris (1996), 1580pp
 Horne, Alistair. Seven Ages of Paris (2002), emphasis on ruling elites excerpt and text search
 Jones, Colin. Paris: Biography of a City (2004), 592pp; comprehensive history by a leading British scholar excerpt and text search
 Lawrence, Rachel; Gondrand, Fabienne (2010). Paris (City Guide) (12th ed.). London: Insight Guides. .
Sutcliffe, Anthony. Paris: An Architectural History (1996) excerpt and text search

In French

List of works, arranged chronologically

Published in the 17th–18th centuries
 
 
 
 

In French
  (see Nicolas de Blégny for information about this author)
 
 
 
  (theatre almanac)
 
  v.2
 
 
  (12 volumes)

Published in the 19th century
1800s-1850s
 
 
 
 
 
 
 
 
 
 

1860s-1890s
 
 
 
 
 
 
 
 
 

In French
  (see  for information about this author)
 
  (15 volumes)
 
 v.12, v.17, v.21

Published in the 20th century
1900s-1950s
 
 
 
  + Bibliography
 
 
 

1960s-1990s
 
 
 Flanner, Janet. Paris Was Yesterday, 1925-1939 (1988); Primary source; her "Letter from Paris," in New Yorker magazine 
 François Loyer, Paris, Nineteenth Century: Architecture and Urbanism, trans. Charles Lynn Clark (New York, 1988)
 
 Wiser, William. The Crazy Years: Paris in the Twenties (1990); focus on artists & celebrities, especially expatriates
 Annick Pardailhe-Galabrun, The Birth of Intimacy: Privacy and Domestic Life in Early Modern Paris, trans. Jocelyn Phelps (Cambridge, 1991).
 Christopher Prendergast, Writing the City: Paris and the Nineteenth Century (Oxford, 1992),
 Bernier,  Olivier. Fireworks at Dusk: Paris in the Thirties (1993); social, artistic, and political life 
 Priscilla Parkhurst Ferguson. Paris as Revolution: Writing the Nineteenth-Century City (Berkeley, 1994)
 
 
 Historical Dictionary of Paris. Landham, Maryland: Scarecrow Press, 1998.
 Sharon Marcus, Apartment Stories: City and Home in Nineteenth-Century Paris and London (Berkeley, 1999)

Published in the 21st century
 Wiser, William. The twilight years: Paris in the 1930s (Robson Books, 2000); Focus on artists & celebrities, especially expatriates
 Harvey, David. Paris, Capital of Modernity (Routledge, 2003)
 
 
 
 
 online review
  Mitchell, Allan. Nazi Paris: The History of an Occupation, 1940-1944 (2010)
 Rearick, Charles. Paris Dreams, Paris Memories: The City and Its Mystique (Stanford University Press, 2011). 296 pp.  online review
 
 Winter,  Jay and Jean-Louis Robert, eds. Capital Cities at War: Volume 2, A Cultural History: Paris, London, Berlin 1914-1919 (2 vol 2012)
 
Castigliano, Federico (2017). Flâneur. The Art of Wandering the Streets of Paris.

Bibliographies

 
  +  Index

See also
 :Category:Books about Paris
 :Category:Documentary films about Paris
 :Category:Music about Paris

Paris
Paris-related lists
Works about Paris